Mart Raterink (born 13 May 1995) is a Dutch football player who plays for SV DFS.

Club career
He made his professional debut in the Eerste Divisie for Achilles '29 on 5 August 2016 in a game against Fortuna Sittard.

References

External links
 

1995 births
People from Doetinchem
Footballers from Gelderland
Living people
Dutch footballers
Achilles '29 players
Eerste Divisie players
Association football defenders